Královice is a municipality and village in Kladno District in the Central Bohemian Region of the Czech Republic. It has about 300 inhabitants.

Geography
It lies in an agricultural landscape of the Lower Eger Table. The Bakovský Stream flows through the municipality.

History

The first written mention of Královice is from 1316.

Transport
The municipality is served by the Královice u Zlonic railway station, situated on the railway line from Kralupy nad Vltavou to Louny.

Sights
The main sight of Královice is a Baroque stone arch bridge over the Bakovský Stream in the centre of the village. The bridge was built shortly after 1871 and is decorated with statues of Saint Wenceslaus and Saint John of Nepomuk. There is also a small chapel from the second half of the 18th century.

References

External links

Villages in Kladno District